Agricultural soil science is a branch of soil science that deals with the study of edaphic conditions as they relate to the production of food and fiber.  In this context, it is also a constituent of the field of agronomy and is thus also described as soil agronomy.

History

Prior to the development of pedology in the 19th century, agricultural soil science (or edaphology) was the only branch of soil science. The bias of early soil science toward viewing soils only in terms of their agricultural potential continues to define the soil science profession in both academic and popular settings . (Baveye, 2006)

Current status

Agricultural soil science follows the holistic method. Soil is investigated in relation to and as integral part of terrestrial ecosystems but is also recognized as a manageable natural resource.

Agricultural soil science studies the chemical, physical, biological, and mineralogical composition of soils as they relate to agriculture. Agricultural soil scientists develop methods that will improve the use of soil and increase the production of food and fiber crops. Emphasis continues to grow on the importance of soil sustainability.  Soil degradation such as erosion, compaction, lowered fertility, and contamination continue to be serious concerns.  They conduct research in irrigation and drainage, tillage, soil classification, plant nutrition, soil fertility, and other areas.

Although maximizing plant (and thus animal) production is a valid goal, sometimes it may come at high cost which can be readily evident (e.g. massive crop disease stemming from monoculture) or long-term (e.g. impact of chemical fertilizers and pesticides on human health). An agricultural soil scientist may come up with a plan that can maximize production using sustainable methods and solutions, and in order to do that they must look into a number of science fields including agricultural science, physics, chemistry, biology, meteorology and geology.

Kinds of soil and their variables

Some soil variables of special interest to agricultural soil science are:

Soil texture or soil composition: Soils are composed of solid particles of various sizes. In decreasing order, these particles are sand, silt and clay. Every soil can be classified according to the relative percentage of sand, silt and clay it contains.
Aeration and porosity: Atmospheric air contains elements such as oxygen, nitrogen, carbon and others. These elements are prerequisites for life on Earth. Particularly, all cells (including root cells) require oxygen to function and if conditions become anaerobic they fail to respire and metabolize. Aeration in this context refers to the mechanisms by which air is delivered to the soil. In natural ecosystems soil aeration is chiefly accomplished through the vibrant activity of the biota. Humans commonly aerate the soil by tilling and plowing, yet such practice may cause degradation. Porosity refers to the air-holding capacity of the soil. See also characterisation of pore space in soil.
Drainage: In soils of bad drainage the water delivered through rain or irrigation may pool and stagnate. As a result, prevail anaerobic conditions and plant roots suffocate. Stagnant water also favors plant-attacking water molds. In soils of excess drainage, on the other hand, plants don't get to absorb adequate water and nutrients are washed from the porous medium to end up in groundwater reserves.
Water content: Without soil moisture there is no transpiration, no growth and plants wilt. Technically, plant cells lose their pressure (see osmotic pressure and turgor pressure). Plants contribute directly to soil moisture. For instance, they create a leafy cover that minimizes the evaporative effects of solar radiation. But even when plants or parts of plants die, the decaying plant matter produces a thick organic cover that protects the soil from evaporation, erosion and compaction. For more on this subject see mulch.
Water potential: Water potential describes the tendency of the water to flow from one area of the soil to another. While water delivered to the soil surface normally flows downward due to gravity, at some point it meets increased pressure which causes a reverse upward flow. This effect is known as water suction.
Horizonation: Typically found in advanced and mature soils, horizonation refers to the creation of soil layers with differing characteristics. It affects almost all soil variables.
Fertility: A fertile soil is one rich in nutrients and organic matter. Modern agricultural methods have rendered much of the arable land infertile. In such cases, soil can no longer support on its own plants with high nutritional demand and thus needs an external source of nutrients. However, there are cases where human activity is thought to be responsible for transforming rather normal soils into super-fertile ones (see terra preta).
Biota and soil biota: Organisms interact with the soil and contribute to its quality in innumerable ways. Sometimes the nature of interaction may be unclear, yet a rule is becoming evident: The amount and diversity of the biota is "proportional" to the quality of the soil. Clades of interest include bacteria, fungi, nematodes, annelids and arthropods.
Soil acidity or soil pH and cation-exchange capacity: Root cells act as hydrogen pumps and the surrounding concentration of hydrogen ions affects their ability to absorb nutrients. pH is a measure of this concentration. Each plant species achieves maximum growth in a particular pH range, yet the vast majority of edible plants can grow in soil pH between 5.0 and 7.5.

Soil scientists use a soil classification system to describe soil qualities. The International Union of Soil Sciences endorses the World Reference Base as the international standard.

Soil fertility

Agricultural soil scientists study ways to make soils more productive. They classify soils and test them to determine whether they contain nutrients vital to plant growth. Such nutritional substances include compounds of nitrogen, phosphorus, and potassium. If a certain soil is deficient in these substances, fertilizers may provide them. Agricultural soil scientists investigate the movement of nutrients through the soil, and the amount of nutrients absorbed by a plant's roots. Agricultural soil scientists also examine the development of roots and their relation to the soil. Some agricultural soil scientists try to understand the structure and function of soils in relation to soil fertility. They grasp the structure of soil as porous solid. The solid frames of soil consist of mineral derived from the rocks and organic matter originated from the dead bodies of various organisms. The pore space of the soil is essential for the soil to become productive. Small pores serve as water reservoir supplying water to plants and other organisms in the soil during the rain-less period. The water in the small pores of soils is not pure water; they call it soil solution. In soil solution, various plant nutrients derived from minerals and organic matters in the soil are there. This is measured through the cation exchange capacity. Large pores serve as water drainage pipe to allow the excessive water pass through the soil, during the heavy rains. They also serve as air tank to supply oxygen to plant roots  and other living beings in the soil.

Soil preservation

In addition, agricultural soil scientists develop methods to preserve the agricultural productivity of soil and to decrease the effects on productivity of erosion by wind and water. For example, a technique called contour plowing may be used to prevent soil erosion and conserve rainfall. Researchers in agricultural soil science also seek ways to use the soil more effectively in addressing associated challenges.  Such challenges include the beneficial reuse of human and animal wastes using agricultural crops; agricultural soil management aspects of preventing water pollution and the build-up in agricultural soil of chemical pesticides. Regenerative agriculture practices can be used to address these challenges and rebuild soil health.

Employment of agricultural soil scientists

Most agricultural soil scientists are consultants, researchers, or teachers. Many work in the developed world as farm advisors,  agricultural experiment stations, federal, state or local government agencies, industrial firms, or universities. Within the USA they may be trained through the USDA's Cooperative Extension Service offices, although other countries may use universities, research institutes or research agencies. Elsewhere, agricultural soil scientists may serve in international organizations such as the Agency for International Development and the Food and Agriculture Organization of the United Nations.

Quotations

See also
 Agricultural science
 Agrogeology
 Agrology
 Compost
 Potting soil
 Soil biology
 Soil conditioner
 Soil science
Regenerative agriculture

References

 
Doran, J., and T. Sims. Renewed vision for Earth Scientists “Sustaining Earth and its People - Translating Science into Practice. Geotimes, July: 5, 2002. 
FAO-AGL, 2006, Soil Biodiversity Portal: Conservation and Management of Soil Biodiversity and its role in Sustainable Agriculture Url last accessed 2006-04-16
Kellog, C.E., 1961, A challenge to American soil scientists: On the occasion of the 25th anniversary of the Soil Science Society of America. Soil Science Society of America Proceedings, 25(6):419-423, 1961.
 Professional Profiles - Agricultural and Food Scientists (Soil Scientists) Url last accessed 2006-04-16
USDA-NRCS Careers in Soil Science Url last accessed 2006-04-16
 Professional Profiles - Agricultural and Food Scientists (Soil Scientists) Url last accessed 2006-04-16

External links

The Soil Science Society of America (SSSA)
British Society of Soil Science

 
Agronomy
Edaphology